Llansamlet railway station served the suburb of Llansamlet, in the historical county of Glamorganshire, Wales, from 1860 to 1875 on the Swansea Vale Railway.

History 
The station was opened on 21 February 1860 by the Midland Railway. It closed on 1 March 1875.

References 

Disused railway stations in Swansea
Former Midland Railway stations
Railway stations in Great Britain opened in 1860
Railway stations in Great Britain closed in 1875
1860 establishments in Wales
1875 disestablishments in Wales